Jordan Smith may refer to:

Sports
Jordan Smith (American football) (born 1998), American football defensive end
Jordan Smith (pitcher) (born 1986), American professional baseball player
Jordan Smith (outfielder) (born 1990), American professional baseball outfielder
Jordan Smith (cricketer) (born 1998), Bermudian cricketer
Jordan Smith (Costa Rican footballer) (born 1991), Costa Rican association football player
Jordan Smith (English footballer) (born 1994), English football goalkeeper
Jordan Smith (fighter) (born 1984), American professional mixed martial artist
Jordan Smith (golfer) (born 1992), English professional golfer
Jordan Smith (rower) (born 1979), American rower and rowing coach
Jordy Smith (born 1988), South African surfer

Other
Jordan W. Smith (1865–1948), physician and political figure in Nova Scotia, Canada
Jordan Patrick Smith (born 1989), Scottish-born Australian actor
Jordan Randall Smith (born 1982), American conductor
Jordan Smith (musician) (born 1993), American singer and musician, winner of Season 9 of The Voice
Jordan Smith (poet) (born 1954), American poet and professor.